The 1940 New South Wales Rugby Football League premiership was the thirty-third season of Sydney’s top-level rugby league club competition, Australia’s first. Eight teams from across the city contested the premiership during the season, which lasted from April until August, culminating in Eastern Suburbs’ victory over Canterbury-Bankstown in the final.

Season summary
For this season St. George returned to Hurstville Oval as their home ground.

Teams
 Balmain, formed on January 23, 1908, at Balmain Town Hall
 Canterbury-Bankstown
 Eastern Suburbs, formed on January 24, 1908, at Paddington Town Hall
 Newtown, formed on January 14, 1908
 North Sydney, formed on February 7, 1908, at the North Sydney School of Arts in Mount Street
 South Sydney, formed on January 17, 1908, at Redfern Town Hall
 St. George, formed on November 8, 1920, at Kogarah School of Arts
 Western Suburbs, formed on February 4, 1908

Ladder

Finals
In the two semi finals, minor premiers Eastern Suburbs defeated St. George whilst fourth-placed Canterbury-Bankstown beat second-placed Newtown. Eastern Suburbs then beat Canterbury-Bankstown in the final to collect their eighth premiership.

Premiership final

Led by their standard-setting captain-coach Dave Brown, the Tricolours continued their strong season performance with a semi-final victory over St George to gain a final berth.

Although Brown was ruled out on the morning of the decider with a leg injury, replacement Bill Brew slotted into the side and scored a try after backing up second rower Sid “Joe” Pearce who also scored the next try. The young Easts team, who averaged twenty years of age, overcame Canterbury by six tries to two.

Eastern Suburbs 24 (Tries: Pierce 2, O'Loan, Brew, Pearce, Clarke. Goals: Dunn 2 )

defeated

Canterbury-Bankstown 14 (Tries: Bonnyman, Denton. Goals: Johnson 4)

References

External links
 Rugby League Tables - Notes AFL Tables
 Rugby League Tables - Season 1940 AFL Tables
 rl1908.com History and Statistics rl1908
 Finals Line-ups and Scores Hunterlink Site
 rl1908.com interview  Sean Fagan interviews Dick Dunn
 Results: 1931-40 at rabbitohs.com.au

New South Wales Rugby League premiership
Nswrfl season